Empowered is a 2018 Spanish comedy film directed by Santiago Segura which consists of a remake of the 2016 Chilean film No Filter. The cast is led by Maribel Verdú.

Plot 
At a first glace everything seems to click in Paz's life. However, deep down, she has a serious problem: she cannot express her emotions to others, causing her much distress. She goes to a shamanic doctor, who prescribes her a potion. The effect of the potion is that Paz begins to express absolutely everything she is thinking about, without beating around the bush.

Cast

Production 
Empowered was written by Benigno López, Marta González de Vega and Santiago Segura, adapting the original screenplay of No Filter by Diego Ayala and Nicolás López. The film was produced by Bowfinger International Pictures S.L. alongside Sin Filtro la película AIE and Atresmedia Cine, with the participation of Movistar+. The budget was valued at €3,894,000, receiving a help from the ICAA of €1,277,543. Shooting took place in different locations of the Madrid region, lasting for seven weeks. The score was composed by Roque Baños and Tessy Díez, whereas Kiko de la Rica worked as cinematographer.

Release 
Distributed by A Contracorriente Films, Empowered was theatrically released in Spain on 2 March 2018, scoring the biggest movie opening weekend for any Spanish domestic release in 2018 (to that date).

Reception 
Reviewing for Fotogramas, Juan Pando scored the film with 3 out of 5 stars, highlighting the "fun" ending credits, whereas he otherwise missed some of the Santiago Segura's trademark "irreverent" humour, which appears "blurred" in the film.

Andrea G. Bermejo of Cinemanía rate it with 3½ out of 5 stars, considering that the film turned out to be a precise portrait of how bad the state of things is.

Quim Casas of El Periódico de Catalunya gave the film 2 out of 5 stars, considering that Segura takes it to his territory, mixing some bite with the simplest comicality.

See also 
 List of Spanish films of 2018

References

External links 
 Empowered at ICAA's Catálogo de Cinespañol

2018 films
2010s Spanish-language films
2018 comedy films
Spanish comedy films
Films shot in the Community of Madrid
Remakes of Chilean films
Films directed by Santiago Segura
Films scored by Roque Baños
Atresmedia Cine films
Bowfinger International Pictures films
2010s Spanish films